When All Is Said is a remastered best of compilation album by the Swedish death metal band Edge of Sanity, released by Black Mark Production on October 2, 2006. On the promotional poster released by Black Mark Production, it reads: "Very remastered by Dan Swanö". On the album cover are mini-pictures of the album covers from all their major releases. Although the two "Crimson" records are featured on a second compact disc, they were remixed and slightly edited in order to be placed together on the same disc, explaining the shortened run time of the two songs.

The album's title comes from the track of the same name on the band's second studio release, Unorthodox, which is not included in the compilation.

Track listing

Disc 1
 "Tales" – 6:02
 "Human Aberration" – 3:34
 "Enigma" – 7:02
 "In The Veins/Darker Than Black" – 4:36
 "Lost" – 4:32
 "The Masque" – 6:36
 "Until Eternity Ends" – 3:58
 "Eternal Eclipse" – 2:51
 "Twilight" – 7:51
 "Black Tears" – 3:08
 "15:36" – 4:37
 "Hell Is Where The Heart Is" – 5:15
 "Hellwritten" – 4:33
 "Bleed You Dry" – 5:24

Disc 2
 "Crimson" – 38:35
 "Crimson II" – 41:22

References

2006 compilation albums
Edge of Sanity albums